The women's race of the 2006 Sparkassen Giro Bochum took place on 13 August 2006. It was the 6th women's edition of the Sparkassen Giro Bochum. The race started and ended in Bochum, Germany with 137 participants and spanned . The race is a UCI 1.1 category race.

Results

References

2006 in German sport
Sparkassen Giro
2006 in women's road cycling